Ahmetović is a predominantly Bosniak surname, a patronymic derived from the given name Ahmet. Notable people with the surname include:

Adis Ahmetovic (born 1993), German politician of Bosnian descent
Denial Ahmetović (born 1995), Bosnian singer
Denis Ahmetović (born 1995), Serbian footballer
Esmir Ahmetović (born 1991), Bosnian footballer
 (born 1914, died 2007), Yugoslav freedom fighter and politician
Mersudin Ahmetović (born 1985), Bosnian footballer

See also
Ahmedović
Ahmetić
Ahmetlić
Ahmedovski
Ahmić

Bosnian surnames
Serbian surnames
Patronymic surnames
Surnames from given names